Marsaglia is an Italian surname, presumably originating in the name of Marsaglia, a commune in Piedmont. People with this surname include:
 George Marsaglia (1924–2011), American mathematician
 Matteo Marsaglia (born 1985), Italian ski racer
 Francesca Marsaglia (born 1990), Italian ski racer
 Lorenzo Marsaglia (born 1996), Italian diver

Italian-language surnames